Muslims, Christians, and Jews co-existed for over seven centuries in the Iberian Peninsula during the era of Al-Andalus states. The degree to which the Christians and the Jews were tolerated by their Muslim rulers is a subject widely contested among historians. The history of Al-Andalus indicates that Muslims, Christians, and Jews who lived within Al-Andalus had relatively peaceful relations, with the exception of a few scattered revolts, and times of religious persecution. The great amount of cultural and social interaction that took place between these three distinct social and religious groups led to the creation of a unique and diverse culture that continued to flourish even after the Reconquista.

Social interaction
The Umayyad conquest of Hispania signaled the coming together of three different religions and the social customs and culture associated with each. This period has become known as the Convivencia, meaning culture of coexistence. Although this idea of a culture of tolerance is disputed by some historians, only a few instances of revolts and violence were actually recorded. This does not mean that discrimination by Muslims did not occur at the local level. However, the more educated classes of Muslims respected Christians and Jews under Islamic law as dhimmis (protected peoples) or People of the Book.  It is important to note that the soldiers who carried out the conquest formed only a small minority of the population of the Iberian Peninsula.  Thus the emergence of this unique Islamic society that formed in al-Andalus was a slow and uneven process. In order to understand how these distinct cultures and societies meshed into one, over time, it is important to recognize what was distinct about each and how they were viewed within the broader society.

Muslims

In al-Andalus, Muslims were divided into three distinct ethnic groups. The largest group was the Berbers. The Berbers, who mostly came from North Africa, were mostly sedentary in lifestyle, not to be confused with the nomadic Berbers found in roughly the same geographic region. In terms of social class, after the invasion, Berbers mostly went on to form the rural proletariat, although a number of them went to the cities, mostly working to pursue crafts. In terms of religion the Berbers were all Muslims, their ancestors having converted mostly to share in the wealth of Arab conquests.

The second group of Muslims found in al-Andalus was the Arabs. They formed a relatively small section of al-Andalus’ total population. They tended to have a higher economic position in society and constituted the majority of the ruling class. They owned land in the richest parts of the country. The most important cultural elements they brought with them were their language and the Arabic tradition of learning and high culture, which emulated that which could be found in Caliphate of Damascus.

However, the actual amount of culture these Arab invaders actually brought with them has been disputed by some historians. Historian W. Montgomery Watt argues that the ancestors of the Arabs that came to invade the Iberian Peninsula had been living a very rough life in the Middle East steppe, thus the actual invaders had little time to acquire a high level of culture.  These Arab and Berber invaders were also busy consolidating their control, having little time and money to devote to purposefully spreading culture to the newly conquered regions. The Islamic Golden Age in Iberia was also, in part, a result of its geographic location and relative isolation from the central part of the Umayyad Empire. The Umayyad rulers felt the need to prove that they were the equals of those in West Asia. This was combined with their need to prove their worth as an independent region. It can thus be concluded that the invading Arabs brought some level of culture to the peninsula, but the high culture that was achieved during the golden age of al-Andalus was the result of the combination and growth of the multiple cultures present in the geographic area.

Muwalladun, or muslims of Iberian descent, were far more numerous than those of purely Arabic descent. They were composed of those descended from the marriages of the original invading Arabs to the native women of Iberia along with those who converted to Islam by choice since the invasions. The muwalladun adopted Arabic genealogies and thus became further fused to the Arabs ethnically over time. By the 10th century, no clear distinction existed between muwalladun and Arab Muslims and by the tenth century, Muslims represented about 80% of the total population of al-Andalus, including Christian converts and the Berber Muslims.

Christians

The Christians living in al-Andalus, both before and after the invasion, were the Visigoths, Hispano-Romans, and the native tribes of the Iberian Peninsula. The Visigoths and the Hispano-Romans formed the noble class prior to the Umayyads. The Christian population as a whole was predominantly Catholic, although some paganism and Arianism still persisted in some areas, mixing with the Catholic tradition.

Under the Christian Visigoth rule, a tradition of learning had been established at Seville by Isidore (636 AD). Over time, Seville became one of the leading intellectual centers of Christian Europe. This Isidorian tradition seems to have been abandoned in favor of the Arabic tradition, although it undoubtedly played a role in the further development of the Arabic tradition on the peninsula.

After the Muslim invasion, the Christians were classified under Islamic law as dhimmis. This status allowed them to practice their religion freely under the Umayyad dynasty. Christians were allowed to maintain many of their churches and the organization of the Church remained mostly intact, with the exception of the confiscation of many Catholic properties. Bishops and other high ranking church officials had to be approved by the Caliphate before they could take office.

Although culturally many Christians adopted the Arabic tradition, the cultural tradition of the Catholic Church and the culture that had developed under the Visigoths was maintained in monasteries by monks. The strong monastic tradition throughout the southern portion of the Iberian Peninsula continued to flourish and develop under Muslim rule. Within the cities, some Christians were able to rise to prominent positions within the Umayyad bureaucracy.

One example is of a Christian with the adopted name of [Abu Umar ibn Gundislavus], who became vizier under Abd al-Rahman III.  Another example being, Revemund, a Christian who was a secretary under the same ruler and was later sent as an ambassador to Germany in 955–6. He eventually became the bishop of Elvira. It is also important to note that Christian artisans, especially from the Eastern Roman Empire, were called to work on various building projects in the Caliphate of Córdoba. Some of these artisans remained integrated into Andalusian society. 
Although Christians lost the absolute dominant status they had previously experienced in Iberia, they were still able to gain positions of prominence under Muslim rule, however, these conditions deteriorated with the Almoravids and Almohads (see Restrictions Imposed on Christians and Jews).

Jews

Jews formed a small but significant ethnic minority in the Iberian Peninsula, constituting about 5% of the total population in al-Andalus. They began to settle in the Iberian Peninsula in significant numbers around the 1st century AD. Under Christian Visigothic rule, Jews faced persecution. In 613, the Visigothic King Sisebut issued a decree which forced Jews to convert to Christianity or be exiled and have their property confiscated. It comes as no surprise that many Jews welcomed their Muslim rulers and saw the Muslim conquest of the Iberian Peninsula as deliverance. After the conquest, under Islamic law, Jews were also categorized as dhimmis, having the same social standing as Christians. The Jewish communities scattered throughout the rural areas of al-Andalus remained fairly isolated, however Jews living in cities and towns, like those in Cordoba that became integrated into Islamic culture and society.

Jews came to hold very influential positions in the Umayyad bureaucracy. One example is the Jewish scholar and physician Hasdai ibn Shaprut, who served as a diplomat of the Umayyad government. Many Jews living in the cities also became involved in trade as merchants. Under the Caliphate of Cordoba, Jews experienced [A Golden Age of Jewish Culture] within Spain, in which Jewish scholars, philosophers, and poets prospered. Jews also contributed to the scientific and mathematic fields of study prominent in Cordoba at this time. Overall, Jews were granted better treatment, with the coming of the Muslims invaders, than they had previously experience under Christian rule. Conditions deteriorated under Almoravid and Almohad rule (see Restrictions Imposed on Christians and Jews).

Restrictions imposed on Christians and Jews

Although Christians and Jews experienced a relatively high degree of religious and social freedom under Muslim rule, they did lack certain rights that were reserved exclusively for Muslims. The dihimmis, which included both Christians and Jews, were required to pay an annual poll tax called a jizya.

If a non-Muslim also owned a substantial amount of cultivatable land, they were required to pay the kharaj or land-tax.

There were also certain restrictions and taxes levied on the church buildings themselves. Certain religious practices like processions, chanting, and church bell ringing, were also censored by law, although the enforcement of these laws varied from region to region. Under Islamic law, dihimmis were supposed to assume a subordinate position in that they were not allowed to hold authority over any Muslim.

In practice, this was not the case, as many Christians and Jews acquired positions in the Cordoban bureaucracy as tax collectors, translators, and secretaries.

That being said, there were numerous advantages to converting to Islam. The ability for social mobility changed drastically upon conversion to Islam. Converts had a greater ability to acquire wealth and status. Slaves were also instantly freed and enfranchised if they converted to Islam reciting the Shahada.
Under the Almoravids tensions grew as more and more restrictions were forced upon non-Muslims, although a certain level of prosperity for religious minorities was still maintained under their rule. Under the Almohads these relative eras of tolerance ended with many Christians and Jews being forced to convert to Islam or face persecution. Many churches and synagogues were destroyed during Almohad rule and many Christians and Jews moved to the newly conquered Christian city of Toledo. Overall, relations between the various religious groups varied from region to region and the term convivencia, or culture of tolerance, cannot be universally applied to Al-Andalus.

Ibn Hazn (1064), a prominent poet and philosopher from Cordoba, described the Christian community as ‘altogether vile,’ demonstrating that prejudices against Christians persisted in Al-Andalus, although it is hard to gauge to what degree since they varied from region to region. The invasion of the Almoravids, and later the Almohads, signaled a shift and eventual end to the religious tolerance fostered under the Caliphate.

Social mobility and conversion

Conversion to Islam translated into a higher rate of social mobility for Christians and Jews alike. There is little documentation available to indicate the conversion rates of Jews in Al-Andalus, although the numbers of Jewish converts have been estimated as relatively small. This is perhaps due to the tightly knit Jewish communities that had formed before the Muslim invasion.

Christians on the other hand were more eager to convert to Islam. Many wished to secure higher ranking government positions; while others took such liking to Islamic teaching and culture that they felt compelled to convert. Half of the Christians in Al-Andalus are reported to have converted to Islam by the 10th century, with more than 80% by the 11th century. Many Christians who did not accept Islam as their religion became increasingly Arabized in terms of culture. These Christians, known as Mozarabs or musta’ribs, a word meaning ‘Arabized’, adopted the Arabic language and customs.

Although the high conversion rates, as well as the adaptation of Arab culture homogenized the society of Al-Andalus to a degree, factionalism still persisted, which lead to occasional revolts and conflicts between the major religious groups.

Religious and social conflicts
At the time of the invasion, many Christians did indeed resist Muslim rule. In these early years, certain kingdoms within Al-Andalus itself attempted to retain semi-autonomous status under Muslim rule, but were soon forced to submit. Many Christians also fled to the mountains up north and eventually formed the northern Christian kingdoms of Iberia that would eventually bring down Islamic rule in the Reconquista.

After this initial struggle, religious fervor did not manifest itself in the form of any significant religious revolts. This is shown by the fact that not a single religious revolt took place during the eighth century within al-Andalus. However, in the middle of the ninth century, a small group of zealous Christians led by Eulogius of Córdoba, a priest who was later canonized by the Catholic Church as a saint, caused a stir mostly around Córdoba by encouraging Muslims to convert to Christianity and publicly denouncing Islamic teaching. Both of these acts were punishable by death under Islamic law. These outbursts were mostly tied to the Christian monastic movement and purposeful martyrdom.

Between 851 and 859, Eulogius and forty-eight other Christians were put to death. The movement did not gain widespread support from Christians in al-Andalus and after the executions the movement subsided.

Religious tolerance deteriorated under the Almoravids and the Almohads. Around the year 1000, Jews were being persecuted throughout al-Andalus, although the city of Toledo still remained fairly tolerant. The Almohads were especially severe in their treatment of non-Muslims and persecution of Christians and Jews prompted many to migrate from al-Andalus.

Hybridisation of cultures: architecture and art
By understanding the background and social standing of each individual religious and ethnic group, as well as their individual cultural backgrounds within Al-Andalus, it is possible to understand how the culture of Al-Andalus formed into, not a completely unified new culture, but rather a composite hybrid culture. These cultural aspects have withstood the test of time and prove as the most evident examples of this hybridisation that can be seen in the art, architecture, language, and literature of Al-Andalus.  The hybrid works that were produced under, and resulted from Muslim rule of Al-Andalus, resulted in what has become known as the Golden age of Jewish culture in Spain and laid the foundation for the European Renaissance and the Scientific Revolution.

Art and architecture

It is important to note that a distinction between Islamic art and architecture is not important since the two are often tied together. Muslim art is limited, in a sense, by Islamic religious dogmas that frown upon the glorification of human being or animals in the form of art. Thus Muslim art tends to avert from depicting people or animals in art. The art of Al-Andalus had a distinctly Arabic and Islamic inspired flavour, and manifested itself mostly in sculptures and mosaics, as well as, other artefacts that served a dual purpose besides that of being aesthetically pleasing. What made these works distinctly Andalusian was the combination of various artistic elements from Catholic, Classical Roman, and Byzantine artistic traditions.

The culmination of Christian and Moorish art culminated in the 11th century. This style became known as the Mozarabic art. This artistic style included ceramics which incorporated mosaic works. It also included the use of repetitive patterns revolving around flower-like designs within sculptures and crafted works. Moorish ivory caskets in Al-Andalus showed signs of western influences. Some depicted individual people and human forms, an element that is not typical in Islamic art.

Visigothic tradition also had an influence on the rulers of Cordoba as they adopted the crowns in the style of those worn by Visigothic kings. Many of these artistic elements were incorporated into architectural works, which reflected Muslim rulers’ desire to associate themselves with their ancestral roots in the Middle East, and indeed to assert their Arabic heritage, even though many of these rulers were hybrids even in terms of their genealogy. This is indicative of the multi-cultural influences that culminated in the unique architectural style of Al-Andalus.

One famous example that illustrates this desire of Muslim rulers’ to tie themselves to their ancestral homeland, while at the same inadvertently reflecting their multiculturalism, is the Great Mosque of Córdoba. Construction began under the reign of Abd ar-Rahman I in 784 AD and was completed in 987 AD. It was built in part to demonstrate the linkage between Al-Andalus and the ancestral land of the Arabs in Syria. The Great Mosque of Cordoba's architectural layout and style shares many similarities with the Great Mosque of Damascus (completed 715). They share many of the same features like the prayer halls, high ceilings held by double-tiered arcades on columns, and many mosaics.  The two also share similar foundation myths, which further points to Muslim attempts in Al-Andalus to reconnect to a nostalgic sense of homeland. Despite these similarities, the mosque is not purely Arabic in style. It is a combination of Roman, Byzantine, and Visigothic architectural elements. The capitals and columns closely emulate older Visigothic and Roman buildings found throughout the city of Cordoba. The red and white colored arches are also reminiscent of the Roman aqueduct of Merida. The mosaics themselves, although connected to those at the Great Mosques of Damascus, are also a hybrid of Christian and Arabic influence.

The artisans that produced these mosaics, both at the Great Mosque and at the Cordoban palace estate al-Rustafa, were called from Byzantium. Another example of the cultural exchange within architecture is illustrated by the Madinat al-Zahra, meaning "beautiful city", on the outskirts of Cordoba started in 996, by Abd-ar-Raham III al-Nasir, which served as the capital of the Iberian Caliphate. Roman influences can be seen throughout with the incorporation of an old Roman statue of a goddess present in the gardens of the building. The feminine form also appeared on all the various gates to the city. The capitals and columns of the palace are also in the style of Christian cathedrals, while Byzantine influence is also seen throughout the construction of the palace.

Byzantium artisans are believed to have come to teach these techniques to Andalusian artisans. Some of the original Byzantium artisans also remained in Al-Andalus and became integrated into Andalusian society. Likewise, Christians and Jews adopted the Arabic architectural elements into their own churches and synagogues built under Moorish rule. This became known as the Mozarabic style. Mozarabic architecture included the absence of exterior decoration, diversity of floor plans, the use of the horseshoe arch in the Islamic style, and the use of the column as support, with a capital decorated with vegetable elements. Moorish styled architecture continued to be popular long after Muslim rule was pushed out of Spain by the Reconquista.

Many Christian Cathedrals were built in the Moorish architectural style. Jewish synagogues, like the Synagogue of El Tránsito in Toledo (built between 1357 and 1363), were built in the Moorish style. The Spanish-Moorish artistic style that is exemplified by the Synagogue of El Tránsito became known as the Mudejar style. Overall, the architecture of al-Andalus is reflective of the cultural exchange that took place between Christian and Arabic architectural styles, the latter being representative of the need of Muslims leaders to form a connectedness with their ancestral homelands.

Language and literature

Much like art and architecture, language and literature are best understood as evolving together through a hybridisation process, in the context of Al-Andalus. It is also important to note that language and literature also had a huge impact on all ideas that flowed into all areas of study, which will be briefly touched on in this section.

The Muslim invasion of Iberia brought about [universal education], which in turn significantly raised literacy rates, compared to the rest of Christian Europe at this time, although rural areas still had lower literacy rates. The literature of Al-Andalus represents a combination of Arabic, Christian, and Jewish styles, which fused over time under the Caliphate of Cordoba.

The Arabic tradition in Al-Andalus has its roots in the Qur’an and in Arabic poems. These poems tended to have both religious and secular subject matter. Some of these poems contained secular themes and love stories that would later be influential to Iberian literature. By the 9th century these poems became lyrical and almost musical in nature. These types of musical poems became known as muwashshahs.  The Muslims also introduced translations of ancient Greek and Roman works that had been lost during the Dark Ages. The Muslim invaders declared Arabic the official language of Al-Andalus, but Arabic was only used by a small minority within the region.

Variations of Romance dialects persisted in many areas and the dialect varied from area to area with no clear boundaries. These Romance languages eventually fused with Arabic and some elements of Hebrew to form the Mozarabic dialect, which became influential in the literature produced in this geographic area. The later dispersion of Mozarabs across the Iberian peninsula explains why many of the words in modern-day Spanish, Portuguese, and Catalan are derived from these early Mozarabic Romance dialects.  It must be stressed that no standard language existed on the Iberian Peninsula as a whole, or even in Al-Andalus itself, at the time this style took shape. This newly formed Mozarabic style first appeared in literature in the kharjas or choruses of the muwashshahs.

These kharjas were usually written in Arabic or Hebrew, but eventually appeared in a vernacular Mozarabic. style  A literal mixture of phrases from the Iberian vernacular, Hebrew, and Arabic was not uncommon in the kharjas. Kharjas are of great importance to the Iberian literary and linguistic tradition because they represent a hybridisation of the Christian and Classical tradition of having repetitive choruses as those found in earlier lyric poems, with the Hebrew and Arabic tradition which emphasised love and the everyday struggles of life. This combination was important to linguistic development as vernacular Romance languages began to adopt and alter Arabic or Hebrew words found in the kharjas.

The evolution of the Mozarabic style in language and literature perpetuated what has come to be called the Golden age of Jewish culture in Spain. The dates for this so-called golden age are widely disputed although they correspond roughly with the beginning of the Caliphate of Cordoba, entering a decline under Almoravid rule, and being put to an end under Almohad rule. Jewish authors living in Al-Andalus became inspired by the influx of ideas that came with the wealth of literature. This literature represented both a translation of classical Greek and Roman works under rulers like al-Hakam II, which had been lost to Europeans previous to the Muslim invasion, and also the coming together of Christian and Arab ideas into entirely new works.

Muslim universities, libraries, courts, and to some degree Christian monasteries were hubs for literature, the former were also hubs for the hybridisation of literature and thus of ideas.  Foreigners from across Europe and the Middle East came to these universities in Al-Andalus, contributing their own ideas, and translating many of the works in Al-Andalus upon their return home. As a result of this literary exchange, a wealth of new literature on the subject of theology, philosophy, science, and mathematics was produced during this time.

The works of Jewish philosopher and theologian Maimonides, Muslim polymath Ibn Rushd(Averroes), Muslim physician Abulcasis, Jewish scholar and physician Hasdai ibn Shaprut, are direct products of the cultural exchange manifested through literature. Their ideas are immortalised through literature, like the novelist Ibn Tufail whose work inspired John Locke’s theory of tabula rasa, which produced far-reaching waves. Both Jewish and Christian scholars adopted Arabic as their language of choice for academic purposes. Jewish poet Moses ben Jacob ibn Ezra, and Christian bishop Recemundus were both bilingual, the latter writing an Arabic-Christian liturgical calendar.

Literary development continued under the Almoravids, although a gradual decline occurred as a result of stricter enforcement of Islamic laws. Under the Almohads, the progressive development of literature, previously started under the Caliphate of Cordoba, almost ceased, with the Almohads censuring works they considered to undermine the authority of the Qur’an. Scholars, like Maimonides, were persecuted and forced to flee. The eventual expulsion of the Almohads, which resulted from the Christian Reconquista, saw a re-emergence of the literary works produced under the Caliphate of Cordoba. The Christian kingdoms of Iberia attempted to uphold the beacon of this literary tradition with the translation of many Arabic and Hebrew works into Latin and later the vernacular (see Toledo School of Translators).

See also

 Timeline of the Muslim presence in the Iberian peninsula
 Muslim conquests
 Caliph of Córdoba
 Al-Garb Al-Andalus
 Almohad dynasty
 La Convivencia
 Islamic Golden Age
 Islam in Spain
 History of Islam
 History of the Jews under Muslim rule
 Golden age of Jewish culture in the Iberian Peninsula
 Islam and antisemitism#Spain
 Arab diaspora
 Spanish people
 Morisco
 Kemal Reis
 List of Moroccan writers#List of Moorish writers

References

Social and cultural exchange
History of Andalusia
Social history of Spain
Andalusian culture